Philipp Poisel  (born 18 June 1983 in Ludwigsburg) is a German singer-songwriter.

Biography

Early life and career beginnings 
Philipp Poisel has produced music since he was a child when he started to play drums and guitar. He recorded his composition with a tape recorder. He was in the choir but he was criticised so much for his singing that he gave up. After completing his Abitur exam, he wanted to be a secondary teacher of English, art and music. However, he was denied acces to higher education as he failed in the entrance examination in music.

First studio album 
After numerous trips throughout Europe, Poisel met his future producer Frank Pilsl, with whom he recorded first demo versions of his songs in the summer 2006. Poisel also founded his own record label Holunder-Records as he couldn't reach an agreement for contract terms with any of the major labels. In 2007, the famous German musician Herbert Grönemeyer noticed Poisel and signed him to his record company Grönland. On 29 August 2008 Poisel's debut album Wo fängt dein Himmel an? was released. His eponymous first single, which was released a few weeks earlier than his debut, hit No. 77 in the German singles chart. Later the same year, Poisel performed in the opening act for Ane Brun, Maria Mena, Suzanne Vega and Herbert Grönemeyer.

Second studio album and commercial breakthrough 
After a concert tour in the German speaking region, Poisel worked on the production of his second studio album Bis nach Toulouse. It was released on 27 August 2010 and reached No. 8 of the German albums chart. It stayed in the top 50 for eight weeks, making it a success, surpassing his debut album.

In 2011, Poisel contributed his previously unreleased ballad "Eiserner Steg" to the soundtrack of the Matthias Schweighöfer-directed movie What a Man which was released on 26 August 2011. The song was released as a single and climbed as high as No. 21 in the German Media Control charts. After it was performed by Benny Fiedler in the singing talent show The Voice of Germany in early January 2012, the song rose from No. 100 to No. 4 of the German singles chart and hitherto his highest single-placement in the German Media Control chart.

In August 2012, Poisel published the live album Projekt Seerosenteich in which he interprets 19 of his songs with new string quartets and piano accompaniment. The album went straight to number one in the German albums chart.

In August 2012, the single "Wolke 7", a duet of Poisel with Max Herre, was released. It stayed in the top 10 of the German singles chart for five weeks.

In September 2012, Poisel's single "Wie soll ein Mensch das ertragen?" jumped from No. 59 to No. 5 in the German singles chart after Jean-Michel Aweh performed the song in the talent show Das Supertalent.  The single also hit the top ten in Austria after Aweh's performance.

In 2014, Poisel was invited by Band Aid 30 Germany to be part of the German version of the charity song "Do They Know It's Christmas?", which celebrated its world premiere on 21 November 2014.

Third studio album 
On 16 September 2016 Philipp Poisel released the song "Erkläre mir die Liebe" in advance from his third studio album.

Poisel lives in Tübingen.

Awards and achievements 
 Poisel was one of the nominated artists at the 2011 Echo in the category National Rock/Pop.
 His debut album Wo fängt dein Himmel an reached Gold record in January 2012.
 His Single Eiserner Steg reached Gold record in 2012.
 His album Bis nach Toulouse reached Platinum record in January 2013 for selling 200,000 copies in Germany.
 His album Projekt Seerosenteich reached Gold record in January 2013 for selling 100,000 copies in Germany.
 His Single  Wie soll ein Mensch das ertragen reached Gold record in 2013 for selling 150,000 copies in Germany.
 His Single Wolke 7 reached Gold record in 2013 for selling 150,000 copies in Germany.

Discography

Albums 
 Wo fängt dein Himmel an? (2008)
 Bis nach Toulouse (2010)
 Projekt Seerosenteich (2012)
 Mein Amerika (2017)
 Neon (2021)

EPs 
 Freunde (2019)

Singles 
 "Wo fängt dein Himmel an?" (2008)
 "Ich & Du" (2008)
 "Und wenn die Welt morgen untergeht" (2008)
 "Halt mich" (2008)
 "Seerosenteich" (2008)
 "Mit jedem deiner Fehler" (2009)
 "Als gäb's kein Morgen mehr" (2009)
 "Wie soll ein Mensch das ertragen" (2010)
 "Bis nach Toulouse" (2010)
 "Zünde alle Feuer" (2010)
 "Innen und Außen" (2010)
 "All die Jahre" (2010)
 "Froh dabei zu sein" (2010)
 "Für keine Kohle dieser Welt" (2010)
 "Im Garten von Gettis" (2011)
 "Eiserner Steg" (2011)
 "Ich will nur" (2012)
 "Wolke 7" (with Max Herre) (2012)
 "Liebe meines Lebens"
 "Bis nach Toulouse" (2013)
 "Herr Reimer"
 "Durch die Nacht"
 "Mit jedem deiner Fehler"
 "Erkläre mir die Liebe" (2016)
 "Bis ans Ende der Hölle" (2016)
 "Das kalte Herz" (2016)
 "Zum ersten Mal Nintendo" (2017)
 "Freunde" (2018)
 "Bordsteinkantenleben" (2019)
 "Alles an dir glänzt" (2020)
 "Das Glück der anderen Leute" (2020)

References

External links 
 Official Website
 Philipp Poisel at ferryhouse and Grönland
 Lyrics at LyricsLounge

1983 births
Living people
People from Ludwigsburg
Echo (music award) winners
21st-century German male singers